Hot Potatoes: The Best of Devo is a compilation of songs by American new wave band Devo, released in 1993 by Virgin Records in the United Kingdom. It contains an exclusive remix of "Whip It" by Psychoslaphead. Originally released on CD and cassette formats, a double-LP edition by Simply Vinyl was later released in 2001.

Critical reception

Steve Huey of Allmusic called Hot Potatoes "the best available single-disc overview of Devo's career, hitting nearly all of the most significant moments from their first five albums", and "superior to the American Greatest Hits, which for some reason does not feature 'Mongoloid', one of the most obvious choices for a Devo hits collection."

Track listing

Personnel
Devo
Mark Mothersbaugh
Gerald Casale
Bob Mothersbaugh
Bob Casale
Alan Myers

Technical
Brian Eno – producer (1–3, 12, 14) 
Roy Thomas Baker – producer (7, 9, 18)
Devo – producer (8, 10, 17), co-producer (4–6, 13, 19)
Ken Scott – producer, engineer (11, 15, 16)
Robert Margouleff – co-producer (4–6, 13, 19)
David Quantick – liner notes

References

Devo compilation albums
1993 greatest hits albums
Virgin Records compilation albums